State Route 121 (SR 121) is a state highway in Churchill County, Nevada. It spurs from U.S. Route 50, east of Fallon, north  to a local road, Settlement Road in Dixie Valley, with the moniker of Dixie Valley Road. SR 121 was assigned in 1976.

Route description
State Route 121 begins at an intersection with U.S. Route 50 (the Austin Highway) to the east of the community of Fallon. Route 121 progresses northward through the United States Naval Recreation and Training Area just to the north of Route 50. The route progresses northward, through the mountains of Churchill County. The highway leaves the Recreation Area and continues its way to the community of Dixie Valley. Dixie Valley Road continues on as a gravel road.

History

Major intersections

See also

References

121
Transportation in Churchill County, Nevada